John Anundson (November 20, 1891 – July 7, 1980) was an American politician. He served as a Republican member of the South Dakota House of Representatives.

Life and career 
Anundson was born in Dell Rapids, South Dakota. He moved to Volga, South Dakota in 1914 and fought during World War I.

In 1949, Anundson was elected to the South Dakota House of Representatives, representing Brookings County, South Dakota, serving until 1954.

Anundson died in July 1980 at the White Care Center in Volga, South Dakota, at the age of 88.

References 

1891 births
1980 deaths
People from Dell Rapids, South Dakota
Republican Party members of the South Dakota House of Representatives
20th-century American politicians